Bittou is a town and seat of the Bittou Department of Boulgou Province in south-eastern Burkina Faso. The town is a stop on the caravan trading route. Today the town is located along the N16 Road which links Burkina Faso with Northern Togo and Ghana (via Togo). In 1898 the French Colonial Army built a fort here to keep the British Colonial Army from capturing the area. As of 2019, the town has a population of 31,210.

Climate
Köppen-Geiger climate classification system classifies its climate as tropical wet and dry (Aw) that closely borders with hot semi-arid (BSh).

See also
List of cities in Burkina Faso

References

Populated places in the Centre-Est Region
Boulgou Province